Warren County is a county in the Commonwealth of Pennsylvania. As of the 2020 census, the population was 38,587. Its county seat is Warren. The county was established in 1800 from parts of Allegheny and Lycoming counties; attached to Crawford County until 1805 and then to Venango County until Warren was formally established in 1819.

Warren County makes up the Warren, Pennsylvania micropolitan statistical area.

Geography
Notable physical features include the Allegheny River, the Allegheny Reservoir, the Kinzua Dam, and the Allegheny National Forest. The county has a warm-summer humid continental climate (Dfb) and average temperatures in the city of Warren range from 24.5 °F in January to 69.3 °F in July.

Climate

Adjacent counties
Chautauqua County, New York (north)
Cattaraugus County, New York (northeast)
McKean County (east)
Elk County (southeast)
Forest County (south)
Venango County (southwest)
Crawford County (west)
Erie County (west)

National protected area
Allegheny National Forest (part)
Allegheny National Recreation Area (part)

Major highways

Demographics

As of the census of 2000, there were 43,863 people, 17,696 households, and 12,121 families residing in the county.  The population density was 50 people per square mile (19/km2).  There were 23,058 housing units at an average density of 26 per square mile (10/km2).  The racial makeup of the county was 98.68% White, 0.21% Black or African American, 0.19% Native American, 0.27% Asian, 0.02% Pacific Islander, 0.12% from other races, and 0.52% from two or more races.  0.34% of the population were Hispanic or Latino of any race. 22.2% were of German, 12.4% Swedish, 11.2% American, 10.5% Irish, 8.8% English, 8.2% Italian, and 5.1% Polish ancestry.

There were 17,696 households, out of which 29.80% had children under the age of 18 living with them, 56.10% were married couples living together, 8.40% had a female householder with no husband present, and 31.50% were non-families. 27.20% of all households were made up of individuals, and 12.20% had someone living alone who was 65 years of age or older.  The average household size was 2.42 and the average family size was 2.93.

In the county, the population was spread out, with 24.10% under the age of 18, 6.40% from 18 to 24, 27.00% from 25 to 44, 25.90% from 45 to 64, and 16.70% who were 65 years of age or older.  The median age was 40 years. For every 100 females there were 96.20 males.  For every 100 females age 18 and over, there were 92.80 males.

2020 Census

Government

|}

Voter Registration
As of February 21, 2022, there are 26,281 registered voters in Warren County.

 Democratic: 7,645 (29.09%)
 Republican: 14,629 (55.66%)
 Independent: 2,366 (9.00%)
 Third Party: 1,641 (6.24%)

State Senate
 Scott E. Hutchinson, Republican, Pennsylvania's 21st Senatorial District
 Michele Brooks, Republican, Pennsylvania's 50th Senatorial District

State House of Representatives
 Kathy Rapp, Republican, Pennsylvania's 65th Representative District

United States House of Representatives
 Glenn Thompson, Republican, Pennsylvania's 15th congressional district

United States Senate
 Pat Toomey, Republican
 Bob Casey, Jr., Democrat

Micropolitan Statistical Area

The United States Office of Management and Budget has designated Warren County as the Warren, PA Micropolitan Statistical Area (µSA).  As of the 2010 U.S. Census the micropolitan area ranked 14th most populous in the State of Pennsylvania and the 298th most populous in the United States with a population of 41,815.

Education

Public school districts
 Corry Area School District
 Titusville Area School District
 Warren County School District (four high schools)

Charter schools
 Tidioute Community Charter School

Vocational school
 Warren County Area Vocational Technical School

Private schools
 Beaver Valley Amish School
 Calvary Chapel Christian School
 Cozy Corners Amish School
 Early Childhood Learning Center
 Forest Amish School
 HR Rouse Children's Center
 Little Ash Parochial School, Sugar Grove
 Meadow View Amish School, Sugar Grove
 Pine Ridge School
 Railroad School
 Round Hill School
 Ruth Smith Children's Home
 St Joseph School
 Stoney Run Amish School
 Warren County Christian School

per Education Names and Addresses directory which is annually developed by the Pennsylvania Department of Education, 2016

Recreation
There is one Pennsylvania state park in Warren County. Chapman State Park is adjacent to Allegheny National Forest and State Game Land 29 just of U.S. Route 6, near Clarendon.  Warren County also contains a tract of old-growth forest called Hearts Content National Scenic Area.

Communities

Under Pennsylvania law, there are four types of incorporated municipalities: cities, boroughs, townships, and, in at most two cases, towns. The following cities, boroughs and townships are located in Warren County:

City
Warren (county seat)

Boroughs
Bear Lake
Clarendon
Sugar Grove
Tidioute
Youngsville

Townships

Brokenstraw
Cherry Grove
Columbus
Conewango
Deerfield
Eldred
Elk
Farmington
Freehold
Glade
Limestone
Mead
Pine Grove
Pittsfield
Pleasant
Sheffield
Southwest
Spring Creek
Sugar Grove
Triumph
Watson

Census-designated places
Census-designated places are geographical areas designated by the U.S. Census Bureau for the purposes of compiling demographic data. They are not actual jurisdictions under Pennsylvania law.

Columbus
North Warren
Russell
Sheffield
Starbrick

Unincorporated communities
Some communities are neither incorporated nor treated as census-designated places.
Akeley
Backup Corners
Lander
Torpedo

Ghost towns
Cornplanter Reservation
Corydon
Kinzua

Population ranking
The population ranking of the following table is based on the 2010 census of Warren County.

† county seat

See also
Hickory Creek Wilderness
National Register of Historic Places listings in Warren County, Pennsylvania

References

External links

Warren County Government Website

 
1819 establishments in Pennsylvania
Populated places established in 1819
Counties of Appalachia